A tridentate ligand (or terdentate ligand) is a ligand that has three atoms that can function as acceptor atoms in a coordination complex.

Well-known tridentate ligands include diethylenetriamine with three nitrogen donor atoms, and the iminodiacetate anion which consists of one deprotonated amine nitrogen and a pair of carboxylate groups.

An octahedrally coordinated atom has six positions around it. Two tridentate ligands may form a complex with such an atom. There are two possible arrangements for such a complex: fac where the coordination is in a triangle on one face of the octahedron, and mer where the coordinating atoms are in an arc around the central atom, with two atoms of the ligand opposite each other. Fac tridentate ligands are termed scorpionate ligands, especially in reference to polypyrazolylborates.

If the tridentate ligand is not symmetrical, then in the fac complexes in octahedral coordination there are three possible isomers. In the mer complexes there are two enantiomers, mirror images of each other.

List

See also
Tripodal ligand

References

 
Coordination chemistry
Ligands